Gheorghe Lazăr (5 June 1779 – 17 September 1823), born and died in Avrig, Sibiu County, was a Transylvanian, later Romanian scholar, the founder of the first Romanian language school in Bucharest, 1817.

Biography
A Habsburg Empire subject, Lazăr was born to a peasant family. He studied in Sibiu, Cluj, and Vienna, training in theology, but also interested in history and philosophy. The strong admiration he had for Napoleon I, as well as other radical opinions he expressed, prevented him from becoming a priest. He later had to flee for Wallachia, where he worked as a tutor and engineer, drawing admiration from boyar Constantin Bălăceanu, who was charged with the administration of schools throughout the Principality.

His school signified the break with a tradition of schooling in Greek (prevalent under Phanariote rule), and also marked a step towards secularism in education. Lazăr was one of the first wave of Romanian Transylvanian teachers to shape schooling in both Wallachia and Moldavia throughout the 19th century.

In 1821 he became gravely ill, and returned to his home village where he died.

Legacy
Today a great number of Romanian highschools are named in his honour. The most prestigious are:
 The Gheorghe Lazăr National College in Bucharest – formed after reorganisation of his first school.
 The Gheorghe Lazăr National College in Sibiu – a school Gheorghe Lazăr himself attended in 1801–1802.

A commune (Gheorghe Lazăr) in Ialomița County was named after him.

A statue of him was erected in Bucharest's University Square, standing in front of the University of Bucharest. The one erected during the communist regime in Sibiu's main square, controversial because of its Socialist Realist style, was removed and is due to be replaced with a more conventional portrait.

References
 Dictionary of Romanian Theologians 

1779 births
1821 deaths
Romanian people in the Principality of Transylvania (1711–1867)
History of Bucharest
People from Avrig
Romanian schoolteachers